Cashmere Technical is an association football club based in Christchurch, New Zealand. It was formed in early 2012 from the merger of two of the city's premier teams, Cashmere Wanderers and Woolston Technical. The two clubs had agreed to work together in early 2011, and the 2011 Christchurch earthquake which devastated their home city and resulted in the loss of many playing facilities hastened their merger into a combined side.

Cashmere Technical play in the Mainland Premier League, and have won the Chatham Cup twice as Cashmere but also once as Christchurch Technical Old Boys.

Club history

Christchurch Technical
Christchurch Technical was formed in 1923 as Christchurch Technical Old Boys. The club changed its name to Christchurch Technical in 1968. It was also known temporarily as Christchurch City, when Woolston Working Men's Club and Christchurch Technical briefly merged to play in the National Soccer League in 2000 and 2001.

Woolston Working Men's Club
Was an association football club based in Woolston, Christchurch, New Zealand. It was formed in 1951 as Waterside, before the name was changed to Woolston Working Men's Club in 1969. The team played in the New Zealand National Soccer League in 1978 and 1981, being relegated back into the regional leagues at the end of both seasons.

Woolston Technical
Woolston Technical was formed in 2007, as a result of a merger between of Christchurch Technical and Woolston Working Men's Club. The two sides had previously merged briefly between 2000 and 2002, playing under the name Christchurch City.

Cashmere Wanderers
Cashmere Wanderers was formed in 1951 as Atlantis AFC, named for its origins among emigrants to New Zealand aboard the Shaw Savill Line ship Atlantis, which arrived in Lyttelton in 1950. In 1961, the club changed its name to Wanderers to reflect its nickname at the time. Then in 1967 it became the Cashmere Wanderers.

Cashmere Technical
In 2012 the clubs of Woolston Technical and Cashmere Wanderers merged to form Cashmere Technical. In 2013, the club would go on to complete a treble, winning the Mainland Premier League, Christchurch Cup and the national Chatham Cup. The club would win the Mainland Premier League again in 2014 and 2015, as well winning the Chatham Cup again in 2014.

Titles
Chatham Cup: 1948, 2013, 2014, 2021
Mainland Premier League: 2013, 2014, 2015
Southern League: 2021

References

Association football clubs in Christchurch
2012 establishments in New Zealand